Pop is a Romanian surname.

List of people with the surname 
Alexandru Pop (born 1945), Romanian rugby union player
Claudiu-Lucian Pop (born 1972), Romanian Greek-Catholic bishop
Florian Pop (born 1952), Romanian mathematician
Gheorghe Pop de Băsești (1835–1919), Austro-Hungarian and Romanian politician
Ioan-Aurel Pop (born 1955), Romanian historian
Iulian Pop (1880–1923), Austro-Hungarian and Romanian lawyer and politician
Jaap Pop (born 1941), Dutch mayor of Franeker, Tiel, Alkmaar and Haarlem
Mihai Pop (1907–2000), Romanian ethnologist
Nicolae Pop (born 1951), Romanian volleyball player
Ramona Pop (athlete) (born 1982), Romanian athlete
Ramona Pop (born 1977), German politician
Ștefan Pop (born 1987), Romanian operatic tenor
Ștefan Cicio Pop (1865–1934), Austro-Hungarian and Romanian lawyer and politician
Virgiliu Pop (born 1974), Romanian space lawyer
Zach Pop (born 1996), Canadian baseball player

Fictional characters 

 Alina Pop, a character from the British soap opera Coronation Street

Surnames from nicknames
Romanian-language surnames
Surnames of Romanian origin